Enteletoidea is an extinct superfamily of brachiopods	in the order Orthida, containing:

 Family Enteletidae
 Family Draboviidae
 Family Chrustenoporidae
 Family Linoporellidae
 Family Saukrodictyidae
 Family Schizophoriidae

References

Rhynchonellata